Hyda basilutea is a moth of the subfamily Arctiinae. It was described by Francis Walker in 1854. It is found in Costa Rica, Colombia, Venezuela and Brazil.

References

Euchromiina
Moths described in 1854